Banghwa-dong is a dong, neighbourhood of Gangseo-gu in Seoul, South Korea.

Eastarjet has its headquarters in Banghwa 2-dong.

Name
The dong was named banghwa, because of the flowers that were abundant in Gaehwa Mountain

Gaehwa-dong

Gaehwa-dong is a dong, neighbourhood of Gangseo-gu in Seoul, South Korea. It is a legal dong (법정동) administered under its administrative dong (행정동), Banghwa 2-dong.

Famous Gaehwa-dong residents 
 Jeong Hyeong-don, Comedian

See also 

Administrative divisions of South Korea
Banghwa Bridge

References

External links
 Gangseo-gu official website
  Gangseo-gu map at the Gangseo-gu official website
  Dong Resident offices of Gangseo-gu
Gangseo-gu official website
 Gangseo-gu map at the Gangseo-gu official website
 Resident offices of Gangseo-gu

Neighbourhoods of Gangseo District, Seoul